Events in the year 1815 in Brazil.

Incumbents
 Monarch – Queen Mary I of Portugal (starting 16 December)

Events
 The United Kingdom of Portugal, Brazil and the Algarves is established under Queen Mary I. Brazil is elevated from the status of Portuguese colony to a constituent country of the united kingdom.

Births

Deaths

References

 
Years of the 19th century in Brazil
Brazil
Brazil